Archepandemis morrisana is a species of moth of the family Tortricidae first described by Akira Mutuura in 1978. It is found in Canada, where it has been recorded from New Brunswick.

The wingspan is up to 16 mm.

References

Archipini
Moths described in 1978
Moths of North America
Taxa named by Akira Mutuura